Mohamed Al Khaja is the first and current United Arab Emirates ambassador to Israel. He took office on 14 February 2021, being the first ambassador to Israel in the country's history. Previously, he was the chief of staff to the Ministry of Foreign Affairs and International Cooperation, where was appointed in 2010.

Early life and education 

Mohamed Al Khaja was born in Abu Dhabi, United Arab Emirates.

Mohamed has spent many years studying in several countries for his education. He holds a degree in Political Science from Northeastern University in Boston, Massachusetts, and a Master of Business Administration from the Vienna University of Economics and Business.

Career and personal life 
Mohamed has taken roles in energy management, disarmament, business development for Mubadala Investment Company, Borouge, and The Emirates Center for Strategic Studies and Research. Mohamed is also involved in academic activities, as he has been appointed as a member of the Board of Trustees of the prominent Sorbonne University in Abu Dhabi, since 2018. Mohamed is married and is a father to four children.

References

External links 

1980 births
Living people
Israel–United Arab Emirates relations
Vienna University of Economics and Business alumni
Northeastern University alumni
Ambassadors of the United Arab Emirates to Israel